Toni Pezo (born 14 February 1987 in Split, Croatia) is a Croatian retired football midfielder who last played for Kaštel Gomilica.

Career
Toni Pezo started off his career in Croatia with Hajduk Split. After spending the 2005–2006 season at the club without any success, he realised he had no real chance of breaking into the first team any time soon so he decided to move in search of more first team football. This move came in the summer transfer window of 2006, he decided to play abroad in Bosnia and Herzegovina with Zrinjski Mostar. After two seasons in Bosnia-Herzegovina, Pezo moved to Albania after attracting interest from SK Tirana. He has found it difficult since moving to Albania but has still impressed during the time that he has been there.
He has since resigned with Hajduk Split. He is currently playing for NK Metalleghe BSI, Bosnia and Herzegovina, Premier Ligue.

Flamurtari Vlorë
Pezo signed for Flamurtari Vlorë on 10 January 2012, along with fellow Croatian Pero Pejić.

References

External links
 Toni Pezo profile at Nogometni Magazin 
 
 
 Profile at Croatian Football Federation

1987 births
Living people
Footballers from Split, Croatia
Association football midfielders
Croatian footballers
Croatia youth international footballers
HNK Hajduk Split players
HŠK Zrinjski Mostar players
KF Tirana players
NK Zadar players
Flamurtari Vlorë players
NK Vitez players
NK Metalleghe-BSI players
NK Lučko players
NK Zagora Unešić players
Croatian Football League players
Premier League of Bosnia and Herzegovina players
Kategoria Superiore players
First Football League (Croatia) players
Croatian expatriate footballers
Expatriate footballers in Bosnia and Herzegovina
Croatian expatriate sportspeople in Bosnia and Herzegovina
Expatriate footballers in Albania
Croatian expatriate sportspeople in Albania